Chartboost is a San Francisco-based mobile game in-app programmatic advertising and monetization platform. Chartboost SDK enables developers to monetize on their mobile apps and connect advertisers to global in-app inventory. Chartboost's platform allows video game developers to create customized interstitial and video ads to promote new games. Developers have direct access to game data derived from Chartboost-enabled games. As of 2016, Chartboost had been integrated into more than 300,000 games with 40 billion game sessions per month. 

In 2019, Chartboost has been ranked on a return on investment index and it scored 6th position on Android and 14th on iOS, on both platforms appearing behind mobile ad networks by Google, Facebook, Unity Technologies, Aarki and Vungle. In 2020 and 2021, Chartboost on Android is not on the list of the top 20 ad networks. On the iOS side, there is uncertainty as well due to new platform restrictions about advertising ID collection which "may render Audience Network so ineffective on iOS 14 that it may not make sense to offer it" - Audience Network and Chartboost being integrated and advertising ID collection being the backbone of both (96% of US users opt-out of app tracking in iOS 14.5).

In May 2021, Zynga acquired Chartboost for $250 million.

Use and features
Game developers use the Chartboost mobile platform to design custom interstitial and video advertisements, build user bases, generate revenue, negotiate business deals with other developers, as well as track and analyze sales and promotion data.

Game ad network
Chartboost only shows promotions to active gamers.

Video
Featuring high-definition videos, Chartboost Video enables developers to customize the design and execution of their video ad campaigns. The service is offered in conjunction with Reward Video, which awards players with virtual currency when they opt to view an offered video.

InPlay
Chartboost InPlay is a customizable, interactive advertisement layer that allows developers to create promotions which display directly in a player's gameplay environment. InPlay is intended to create promotions that integrate with the look and feel of a particular game. The native advertising solution supports standard Chartboost features such as tracking and reporting, player targeting, and cost per impression maximization.

Insights
Every month, Chartboost releases a global heat map that details the average cost per install on iOS and Android devices. Data for the map is taken from the network of 12 billion Chartboost-enabled monthly game sessions.

History
Chartboost was launched in 2011 by Maria Alegre (Co-founder) and Sean Fannan (CTO). After departing from Tapulous, the co-founders set out to create an own self-developed platform that allowed game developers to have complete transparency and control over the promotion, sale, revenue, and management of their mobile games.

In January 2013 Chartboost announced a $19 million Series B funding round led by Sequoia Capital.

In April 2013 Chartboost opened its first international office in Amsterdam. Led by Pepe Agell, the office manages growth throughout Europe.

In February 2016 Chartboost acquired Roostr to connect mobile games with YouTube influencers.  Roostr was rebranded to Chartboost Influence and then both were shut down (that is, Chartboost exited the influencer market).

In May 2021, Zynga acquired Chartboost for $250 million.

Recognition
 In 2014 Chartboost was listed in the VentureBeat Index Report as one of the top 10 mobile advertising companies.
 In 2014 Maria Alegre was listed in Forbes Magazine's 30 under 30 list of "The Brightest Young Stars in Video Games".
 In 2014 Chartboost was named "Best Places to Work" by the San Francisco Business Times.
 In 2013 Maria Alegre was listed in Forbes Magazine’s 30 under 30 list in "Marketing & Advertising".
 In 2013 Maria Alegre was listed by El País as one of the Top 100 Most Relevant People of the year.

References

Video game companies of the United States
Video game development companies
Video game companies established in 2011
Companies based in San Francisco
Mobile game companies
Zynga
2021 mergers and acquisitions